This is a list of important participants in Muslim feminism, originally sorted by surname within each period.

It may include, for instance, earlier authors who did not self-identify as feminists but have been claimed to have furthered "feminist consciousness" by a resistance of male dominance expressed in their works.

Early and mid 19th-century feminists 
Born between 1801 and 1874.

Late 19th-century and early 20th-century feminists 
Born between 1875 and 1939.

Mid to late 20th-century and notable 21st-century feminists 
Born from 1940 to present

Muslim feminist movements
 Gerwani
 Musawah
 Sister-hood
 Sisters in Islam
 Voice of Libyan Women
 Women's Islamic Initiative in Spirituality and Equality
Revolutionary Association of the Women of Afghanistan
Women Living Under Muslim Laws

See also 
Islamic feminism
Women in Islam
List of feminists
Liberalism and progressivism within Islam
Islamo-Leftism
Islamic socialism

References

External links
 National Women's History Project
 FemBio – Notable Women International

Muslim
Feminists
 
Feminists, Muslim